Below is a list of squads used in the 1988 African Cup of Nations.

Group A

Algeria
Coach:  Evgeny Rogov

Ivory Coast
Coach: Yeo Martial

Morocco
Coach:  José Faria

Zaire
Coach:  Otto Pfister

Group B

Cameroon
Coach:  Claude Le Roy

Egypt
Coach:  Mike Smith

Kenya
Coach: Chris Makokha

Nigeria
Coach:  Manfred Honer

References
RSSSF
RSSSF – Final Tournament Details

Africa Cup of Nations squads
squads